Heterodera oryzicola, the rice cyst nematode, is a plant pathogenic nematode, which is cited as an invasive species.

References 

oryzicola
Plant pathogenic nematodes
Rice diseases
Nematodes described in 1978